Alexander Hunter (1729–1809) was a Scottish physician, known also as a writer and editor.

Alexander Hunter is also the name of:
 Alexander Hunter (planter) (1750–1804), American tobacco planter
 Alexander Hunter (novelist)  (1843-1914) American writer
 Alexander Hunter (footballer) (1862–1899), Welsh footballer
 Alexander Hunter (politician), Northern Irish politician
 Alexander Hunter (Madras surgeon) (1816–1890), Scottish surgeon in Madras and patron of art
 Alex Hunter (footballer) (1895–1984), Scottish footballer (goalkeeper for Queen's Park, Tottenham Hotspur) 
 Alex Hunter (economist) (1919–1971), Scottish-Australian industrial economist
 Sandy Hunter (born 1939), British Air Marshal
 Sandy Hunter (footballer) (fl. 1920s), Scottish footballer for Hamilton Academical and Motherwell

See also 
 Alex Hunter (disambiguation)
 Hunter (surname)